John Galpin (25 May 1918 – 23 December 1983) was a South African cricketer. He played in one first-class match for Eastern Province in 1935/36.

See also
 List of Eastern Province representative cricketers

References

External links
 

1918 births
1983 deaths
South African cricketers
Eastern Province cricketers
Cricketers from Port Elizabeth